The Sarabhai Institute of Science and Technology, commonly known as SIST, is in Thiruvananthapuram, the capital city of Kerala. It was founded in 2004.
The college is affiliated to KTU (APJ Abdul Kalam Technological University). 

The Institution provides 4-year B. Tech Programmes in:
Civil Engineering, Computer Science & Engineering, Electrical &  Electronics Engineering, Electronics & Communication Engineering,  Electronics & Instrumentation Engineering and Mechanical Engineering. 
All B. Tech Programmes have 60 seats. 

There are 2-year Post Graduation Programmes (M. TECH) in:
Computer & Information Science, Software Engineering, Optoelectronics Engineering, Signal Processing, Thermal Engineering and Geotechnical Engineering. 

All PG Programmes have 18 seats. 

Engineering colleges in Thiruvananthapuram
Educational institutions established in 2004
2004 establishments in Kerala